Kenneth Allan Kragen (November 24, 1936 – December 14, 2021) was an American music manager, television producer, author, speaker and non-profit consultant, best known for his role in organizing the 1985 benefit record "We Are the World" and the 1986 charity event Hands Across America.

Life and career
Kenneth Allan Kragen was born on November 24, 1936 as the son of Billie Bercovich, a professional violinist, and Adrian Kragen, a noted tax lawyer. His birthplace has been variously cited as Alameda or Berkeley, California.  He attended the University of California, Berkeley and Harvard Business School.

Kragen was personal manager to numerous musicians, including country music stars Trisha Yearwood, Travis Tritt, Dottie West and Kenny Rogers for many years. When Kragen was the executive producer of The Smothers Brothers Comedy Hour, he met Kenny Rogers and The First Edition and became their manager. Kragen was the executive producer of their show Rollin on the River.

Kragen married Cathy Worthington in 1978 and had a daughter.

Charity events
In 1985, he was instrumental in securing the talent that appeared on the fund-raising single and album We Are the World. Harry Belafonte contacted Kragen, who was then managing Lionel Richie and Kenny Rogers, about putting together a concert to help raise money for African causes. Kragen doubted that a concert would make enough of a difference and suggested a charity single instead, including about a dozen artists. However, response from musicians was overwhelming, and Kragen turned down several dozen artists who wished to appear on the song.

The group, known as USA for Africa, included Michael Jackson, Richie, Bruce Springsteen, Cyndi Lauper, Rogers, and many other pop music stars of the day. According to Kragen, who brought Quincy Jones on board to produce the song, a record company president suggested that he also organize an album of unreleased songs by the same group of artists. The project ultimately raised $64 million for poverty relief both in Africa and the US. A year later, Kragen organized another charity event, Hands Across America, a human chain across the contiguous United States that involved 6.5 million people. Kragen had been the manager for musician Harry Chapin, who, before his death in 1981, was a leading anti-hunger activist. Kragen, explaining his work on these benefit events, said, "I felt like Harry had crawled into my body and was directing everything."
In 2010 Kragen founded HomeAid.net, an annual campaign and event to benefit America's homeless, with David Mathison.

Later life
Kragen continued to work actively as a consultant for several companies and non-profits including the Southern California Jet Propulsion Laboratory; the Juvenile Diabetes Research Foundation; and Rallysong100.  He recently sold a reality show to Fremantle and was in development on four other shows. He was writing a book with Tony Robbins and was producing an awards show in 2015 for the magazine Live Happy. In 1997 Kragen was a featured speaker at, and consultant to, the Interface Corporation's annual meeting, held in Maui, which won the Global Paragon Award for strategic excellence from Meeting Professionals International. He portrayed himself in the 1996 TV movie The Late Shift about the battle between Jay Leno and David Letterman for The Tonight Show. A dispute between Kragen and Leno's longtime manager and executive producer at The Tonight Show, Helen Kushnick, contributed to Kushnick's departure.

Kragen received multiple awards, including the United Nations' Peace Medal, the Man of The Year from the Boys and Girls Clubs of Southern California, two MTV Video Awards, and several Grammy nominations. He was a professor at UCLA.

Kragen died from natural causes at his home in the Brentwood neighborhood of Los Angeles, on December 14, 2021, at the age of 85.

References

External links

Ken Kragen official site

1936 births
2021 deaths
20th-century American businesspeople
21st-century American businesspeople
American music managers
Businesspeople from California
Harvard Business School alumni
People from Alameda County, California
People from Brentwood, Los Angeles
Television producers from California
UCLA Herb Alpert School of Music faculty
University of California, Berkeley alumni